Deer Island is an island off the coast of Biloxi, Mississippi that was once part of the mainland and is not a barrier island. In 2011, TITANTubes, sometimes referred to as geotubes, were utilized as low profile dune cores to protect the island.

Debate 

For several years, local casinos tried to develop the island. However, the majority of the island was acquired by the State of Mississippi on May 24, 2002, which intends to preserve its current undeveloped state.

Wildlife

Deer island is home to 10 endangered species of plants and animals.

References

Further reading 
Deer Island becomes Coastal Preserve  Retrieved 2-2-2009.

Islands of Mississippi
Barrier islands of Mississippi
Landforms of Harrison County, Mississippi
Protected areas of Harrison County, Mississippi